Nuannuan is a railway station on the Taiwan Railways Administration Yilan line located in Nuannuan District, Keelung, Taiwan.

History
The station was opened on 5 May 1919.

Around the station
 Nuannuan Ande Temple
 Nuannuan Sports Park
 Nuannuan Waterfront Park

See also
 List of railway stations in Taiwan

References

1919 establishments in Taiwan
Railway stations in Keelung
Railway stations opened in 1919
Railway stations served by Taiwan Railways Administration